August Uihlein Pabst III is a former racing driver and current team owner of Pabst Racing. He is also the great-great grandson of Frederick Pabst, founder of the Pabst Brewing Company, and the great-great grandson of August Uihlein of Joseph Schlitz Brewing Company.

Racing career
Augie was born into a racing family. His father, Augie Pabst, won the SCCA National Sports Car Championship in the B Modified class in 1960. 

Pabst started his auto racing career in Sports Car Club of America in 1991. After racing in Formula Ford Pabst started in the Shelby Can-Am class. The driver from Oconomowoc, Wisconsin won the 1995 Cen-Div Division National championship in the amateur Shelby Can-Am class. and placed second in the Dodge Pro Series.  The following year Pabst competed in the Formula Continental class placing nineteenth in the Cen-Div National championship.

In 1997 Pabst competed his last season in the United States Formula Ford 2000 National Championship . Racing a Van Diemen chassis Pabst scored various top ten finishes placing thirteenth in the championship standings.

Racing management
In 1998 Pabst took over Pabst Racing Services expanding the race team. Pabst focused on the servicing of a variety of race cars for clients. The team was most dedicated to their USF2000 entry. Tõnis Kasemets was one of the drivers successful for the Pabst team winning races in the series. In 2005 Pabst was the crew chief for Kasemets in the Atlantic Championship. Kasemets entered his own team, Team Tonis, which was technically supported by Pabst Racing Services.

Pabst Racing is a four-time U.S. F2000 National Championship team champion (2017-19, 2022), and fields teams at the USF2000 and USF Pro 2000 levels.

Racing record

SCCA National Championship Runoffs

American Open-Wheel racing results
(key) (Races in bold indicate pole position, races in italics indicate fastest race lap)

Complete USF2000 National Championship results

References

SCCA National Championship Runoffs participants
Living people
Year of birth missing (living people)
Place of birth missing (living people)
Barber Pro Series drivers
U.S. F2000 National Championship drivers
Uihlein Family